The 2020–21 Pac-12 Conference men's basketball season began with practices in October 2020 followed by the 2020–21 NCAA Division I men's basketball season in November 2020. The conference schedule began in December 2020. This was the ninth season under the Pac–12 Conference name and the 61st since the conference was established under its current charter as the Athletic Association of Western Universities in 1959. Including the history of the Pacific Coast Conference, which operated from 1915 to 1959 and is considered by the Pac-12 as a part of its own history, this is the Pac-12's 105th season of basketball.  The Pac-12 announced on Dec. 4, 2019 they would expand conference play to a 20-game schedule, with the two addition games per school, one at home and the other on the road, being added during the months of November and December.

The Pac-12 tournament is scheduled for March 10–13, 2021 at the T-Mobile Arena in Paradise, Nevada.

Pre-season

Recruiting classes

Preseason watchlists
Below is a table of notable preseason watch lists.

Preseason All-American teams

Preseason polls

Pac-12 Media days
Source:

Early season tournaments
All usually scheduled non conference basketball tournaments were cancelled due to Covid-19 Pandemic.

Pac-12 Preseason All-Conference

First Team

Second Team

Honorable Mention
James Akinjo (ARIZ, PG)
Evan Battey (COLO, PF)
Quade Green (WASH, PG)
Jalen Hill (UCLA, PF)
Jaime Jaquez Jr. (UCLA, SF)

Midseason watchlists
Below is a table of notable midseason watch lists.

Final watchlists
Below is a table of notable year end watch lists.

Regular season
The Schedule will be released in late October. Before the season, it was announced that for the seventh consecutive season, all regular season conference games and conference tournament games would be broadcast nationally by CBS Sports, FOX Sports, ESPN Inc. family of networks including ESPN, ESPN2 and ESPNU, and the Pac-12 Network.

Records against other conferences
2020-21 records against non-conference foes as of (January 19, 2021):

Regular Season

Record against ranked non-conference opponents
This is a list of games against ranked opponents only (rankings from the AP Poll):

Team rankings are reflective of AP poll when the game was played, not current or final ranking

† denotes game was played on neutral site

Conference schedule
This table summarizes the head-to-head results between teams in conference play.

Points scored

Through March 22, 2021

Rankings

Head coaches

Coaching changes
There were no coaching changes during the 2020 off season.

Coaches
Note: Stats shown are before the beginning of the season. Overall and Pac-12 records are from time at current school.

Notes:
 Overall and Pac-12 records, conference titles, etc. are from time at current school and are through the end the 2019–20 season.
 NCAA tournament appearances are from time at current school only.
 NCAA Final Fours and Championship include time at other schools

Post season

Pac-12 tournament

Oregon State won the conference tournament from March 10–13, 2021, at the T-Mobile Arena, Paradise, NV. The top four teams had a bye on the first day. Teams were seeded by conference record, with ties broken by record between the tied teams followed by record against the regular-season champion, if necessary.  Arizona announced a self imposed post season ban for the 2020–21 NCAA season, which includes the Pac–12 tournament.

NCAA tournament

Five teams from the conference were selected to participate: Colorado, Oregon, Oregon State, UCLA & USC. While the highest seed was Colorado at No. 5, two teams—USC and Oregon State—advanced to the Elite Eight, and UCLA made it to the Final Four.

^ VCU withdrew from the tournament due to positive Covid-19 test, resulting in Oregon advancing to the round of 32 via No Contest

National Invitation Tournament 
No teams from the conference were selected to participate:

Postseason Records against other conferences
2020-21 postseason records against non-conference foes as of (April 4, 2021):

Regular Season

^ totals do not include the Oregon no-contest due to VCU withdrawing due to Covid-19 or the result of the Oregon vs USC sweet 16 matchup.

Awards and honors

Players of the Week 
Throughout the conference regular season, the Pac-12 offices named one or two players of the week each Monday.

Totals per School

All-Americans

Evan Mobley, USC, Second team (AP, Sporting News, USBWA)
Chris Duarte, Oregon, Third team (AP, USBWA)

Hoophall awards
Jerry West Award - Chris Duarte, Oregon

All-District
The United States Basketball Writers Association (USBWA) named the following from the Pac-12 to their All-District Teams:
District VIII

All-District Team

District IX
Player of the Year

All-District Team

The National Association of Basketball Coaches (NABC) named the following from the Pac-12 to their All-District Teams:
District 19
Player of the Year

Coach of the Year
Andy Enfield, USC

All-District First Team
 Oscar da Silva, Stanford
 Evan Mobley, USC
 Chris Duarte, Oregon
 McKinley Wright IV, Colorado
 Tyger Campbell, UCLA

All-District Second Team
 Timmy Allen, Utah
 Remy Martin, Arizona St.
 Isaac Bonton, Washington St.
 James Akinjo, Arizona
 Eugene Omoruyi, Oregon

Conference awards
Voting was by conference coaches.

Individual awards

All-Pac-12

First Team

 ‡ Pac-12 Player of the Year
 ††† three-time All-Pac-12 First Team honoree
 †† two-time All-Pac-12 First Team honoree
 † two-time All-Pac-12 honoree

Second Team

Honorable Mention
 Evan Battey, (COLO, PF)
 Jaiden Delaire, (STAN, SF)
 Quade Green, (WASH, PG)
 Ąžuolas Tubelis, (ARIZ, PF)
 Noah Williams, (WSU, SG)

All-Freshman Team

† Pac-12 Player of the Year
‡ Pac-12 Freshman of the Year
Honorable Mention
 Marcus Bagley, (ASU, SG)
 Josh Christopher, (ASU, SF)
 Dishon Jackson, (WSU, C)
 Ziaire Williams, (STAN, SF)

All-Defensive Team

† Pac-12 Player of the Year
‡Pac-12 Defensive Player of the Year
†† two-time Pac-12 All-Defensive Team honoree
Honorable Mention
 Warith Alatishe, (OSU, PF)
 Bryce Wills, (STAN, PG)
 McKinley Wright IV, (COLO, PG)

All-Academic team
The Pac-12 moved to seasonal Academic Honor Rolls, discontinuing sport-by-sport teams, starting in 2019-20 

‡ indicates player was Pac-12 Scholar-Athlete of the Year
†† two-time Pac-12 All-Academic honoree
††† three-time Pac-12 All-Academic honoree

2021 NBA draft

Home game attendance 
The Pac–12 announced October 29th, 2020 that fans would not be allowed to attend any team home games until at least January 2021 due to the Covid-19 Pandemic. 

Bold – At or Exceed capacity
†Season High

References